Daddo is a surname. Notable people with the surname include:

 Andrew Daddo (born 1967), Australian actor, author, and television personality
 Cameron Daddo (born 1965), Australian actor, musician, and presenter
 Lochie Daddo (born 1970), Australian actor and television presenter, brother of Andrew and Cameron